Louis Burton (born 4 June 1985 in Ivry-sur-Seine, France) is a French yachtsman who competes in ocean racing.

Race result highlights
Reference

References

External links 
 Official Website 

1985 births
Living people
French male sailors (sport)
Vendée Globe finishers
2012 Vendee Globe sailors
2016 Vendee Globe sailors
2020 Vendee Globe sailors
French Vendee Globe sailors
Single-handed circumnavigating sailors